Oruza is a genus of moths of the family Erebidae erected by Francis Walker in 1862.

Description
Palpi upturned, reaching vertex of head, where the second joint hairy in front and third joint minute. Antennae of male ciliated and with bristles at the joints. Thorax and abdomen slightly scaled. Forelegs with hairy tibia and femur. Hindlegs of male with outer side hairy tibia and tarsi, with long short scaly spurs. Hindwings with long hairy tibia and tarsi in both sides and scaly spurs. Forewings rather elongate, with round apex. Vein 8 anastomosing with veins 9 and 10 to form the areole. Hindwings with stalked veins 3 and 4. Larva with two pairs of abdominal prolegs.

Taxonomy
The genus has previously been classified in the subfamily Aventiinae within Erebidae or in the subfamily Acontiinae of the family Noctuidae.

Species

References

Boletobiinae
Noctuoidea genera